Aleksandr Sergeyevich Gagloyev (born 13 December 1990) is a Russian professional footballer. He plays for FC KAMAZ Naberezhnye Chelny.

Club career
He made his professional debut in the Russian Football National League in 2007 for FC Alania Vladikavkaz.

Honours
 Russian Professional Football League Zone East Best Player: 2015–16.

References

1990 births
People from Tskhinvali
Living people
Russian footballers
Association football midfielders
FC Spartak Vladikavkaz players
FC Neftekhimik Nizhnekamsk players
FC Orenburg players
FC Sakhalin Yuzhno-Sakhalinsk players
FC KAMAZ Naberezhnye Chelny players
FC SKA-Khabarovsk players
Russian First League players
Russian Second League players